The 1945 Iowa Hawkeyes football team represented the University of Iowa in the 1945 Big Ten Conference football season. This was Clem Crowe's only season as head coach for the Hawkeyes.

Schedule

References

Iowa
Iowa Hawkeyes football seasons
Iowa Hawkeyes football